The women's 500 meter at the 2021 KNSB Dutch Single Distance Championships took place in Heerenveen at the Thialf ice skating rink on Saturday 31 October 2020. Although this edition was held in 2020, it was part of the 2020–2021 speed skating season.

There were 24 participants who raced twice over 500m so that all skaters had to start once in the inner lane and once in the outer lane. There was a qualification selection incentive for the next following 2020–21 ISU Speed Skating World Cup tournaments.

Title holder was Jutta Leerdam.

Overview

Result

Draw 1st 500m

Draw 2nd 500m

Referee: Wycher Bos. Assistant: Björn Fetlaar 
Starter: Janny Smegen 

Source:

References 

Single Distance Championships
2021 Single Distance
World